Akeakamai (c. 1976 – November 12, 2003) (Nickname: Ake ("ah-KAY")) was a female Atlantic bottlenose dolphin, who, along with a companion female dolphin named Phoenix, and later tankmates Elele and Hiapo, were the subjects of Louis Herman's animal language studies at the Kewalo Basin Marine Mammal Laboratory in Honolulu, Hawaii. The most well-known paper is the original work described in Herman, Richards, & Wolz (1984).  Akeakamai was also the subject of many other scientific studies of dolphin cognition, language acquisition, and sensory abilities.

Physically identifying features of Akeakamai included a straight eye line, a half-circle-shaped notch in the right side of her tail fluke, a small "Eiffel Tower"-shaped mark above her right eye,  a thin notch in the side of her upper mouth, and a particularly wide melon.  She also had characteristic in-air whistle calls, including an unusual high-low-high whistle that was well below typical signature whistle frequencies. In the Hawaiian language, Akeakamai means "philosopher" or "lover (ake) of wisdom (akamai)".  Akeakamai was also the name given to an uplifted dolphin character in David Brin's science fiction novel Startide Rising.

Akeakamai was euthanized due to cancer on November 12, 2003.

See also
 Animal language
 Cetacean intelligence
 List of individual cetaceans
 Startide Rising

Notes

References

Media and press appearances

 Akeakamai can be seen in: National Geographic's Dolphins with Robin Williams, BBC's Wildlife on One's Dolphins: Deep Thinkers with David Attenborough, ABC's Touched by a Dolphin with Sharon Lawrence, The Discoverers IMAX, Dolphins IMAX, and NOVA.

Scientific references

 Cowan, R. (2003). Short-term memory for behavior in bottlenosed dolphin (Tursiops truncatus). Unpublished Masters thesis. University of Hawaii, Honolulu.
 Herman, L. M. (2002). Exploring the cognitive world of the bottlenosed dolphin. In M. Bekoff, C. Allen & G. Burghardt (Eds.) The cognitive animal: Empirical and theoretical perspectives on animal cognition. pp. 275–283. Cambridge, MA: MIT Press.
 Herman, L. M. (2002). Vocal, social, and self-imitation by bottlenosed dolphins. In C. Nehaniv & K. Dautenhahn (Eds.). Imitation in Animals and Artifacts. pp. 63–108. Cambridge, MA. MIT Press
 Mercado, E. III, Killebrew, D.A., Pack, A.A., Macha, I.V.B., Herman, L.M. (2000). Generalization of 'same-different' classification abilities in bottlenosed dolphins. Behavioural Processes, 50, 79-94.
 Herman, L.M., Abinchandani, S.L., Elhajj, A.E., Herman, E.Y.K., Sanchez, J.L., & Pack, A.A. (2000). Dolphins (Tursiops truncatus) comprehend the referential character of the human pointing journal. Journal of Comparative Psychology, 113(4), 347-364.
 Braslau-Schneck, S. (1994). Innovative Behaviors and Synchronization in Bottlenosed Dolphins. Unpublished master's thesis, University of Hawaii, Honolulu.
 Herman, L.M., Pack, A.A. & Wood, A. M. (1994). Bottlenosed Dolphins Can Generalize Rules and Develop Abstract Concepts. Marine Mammal Science, 10, 70-80.
 Herman, L.M., Kuczaj, S. A. II, & Holder, M. D. (1993). Responses to Anomalous Gestural Sequences by a Language-Trained Dolphin: Evidence for Processing of Semantic Relations and Syntactic Information. Journal of Experimental Psychology, General, 122, 184-194.
 Herman, L. M., Pack A. A. & Morrel-Samuels, P. (1993). Representational and conceptual skills of dolphins. In H. R. Roitblat, L. M. Herman & P. Nachtigall (Eds) : Language and Communication: Comparative Perspectives, 273-298. Hillside, NJ: Lawrence Erlbaum.
 Holder, M. D., Herman, L. M. & Kuczaj, S. III (1993). A bottlenosed dolphin's responses to anomalous gestural sequences expressed within an artificial gestural language. In H. R. Roitblat, L. M. Herman & P. Nachtigall (Eds): Language and Communication: Comparative Perspectives, 299-308. Hillsdale, NJ: Lawrence Erlbaum.
 Morrel-Samuels, P. & Herman, L. M. (1993). Cognitive factors affecting comprehension of gesture language signs: A brief comparison of dolphins and humans. In H. R. Roitblat, L. M. Herman & P. Nachtigall (Eds): Language and Communication: Comparative Perspectives, 211-222. Hillsdale, NJ: Lawrence Erlbaum.
 Prince, C. G. (1993). Conjunctive Rule Comprehension in a Bottlenosed Dolphin. Unpublished master's thesis, University of Hawaii, Honolulu.
 Herman, L. M. (1990). Cognitive performance of dolphins in visually guided tasks. In J. A. Thomas and R. A. Kastelein (Eds.), Sensory abilities of cetaceans: Laboratory and field evidence, (pp. 455–462). New York: Plenum.
 Herman, L. M., Morrel Samuels, P. (1990). Knowledge acquisition and asymmetries between language comprehension and production: Dolphins and apes as a general model for animals. In M. Bekoff & D. Jamieson (Eds.), Interpretation and explanation in the study of behavior: Vol 1: Interpretation, intentionality, and communication, 283-312. Boulder: Westview Press.
 Herman, L. M., Morrel-Samuels, P. and Pack, A. A. (1990). Bottlenosed dolphin and human recognition of veridical and degraded video displays of an artificial gestural language. Journal of Experimental Psychology: General, 119, 215-230.
 Shyan, M. R. and Herman, L. M. (1987). Determinants of recognition of gestural signs in an artificial language by Atlantic bottle-nosed dolphins (Tursiops turncatus) and humans (Homo sapiens). Journal of Comparative Psychology, 101, 112-125.
Herman, L. M. (1987). Receptive competences of language-trained animals. In J. S. Rosenblatt, C. Beer, M. C. Busnel, & P. J. B. Slater (Eds.), Advances in the Study of Behavior. Vol. 17, 1-60. Petaluma, CA: Academic Press.
Herman, L. M., Richards, D. G. & Wolz, J. P. (1984). Comprehension of sentences by bottlenosed dolphins. Cognition, 16, 129-219.
Herman, L. M. and Forestell, P. H. (1985). Reporting presence or absence of named objects by a language-trained dolphin. Neuroscience and Bioehavioral Reviews, 9, 667-691.
 Tarbox, B. J. (1988) Tursiops electronicus: Stimulated tutoring of a language trained dolphin interview in the free Prolog chapter of Seven Languages in Seven Weeks from Bruce Tate. Unpublished master's thesis, University of Hawaii, Honolulu.

External links
The Dolphin Institute
Dolphin research publications. Not all include Akeakamai.

1976 animal births
2003 animal deaths
Individual dolphins
Individual animals in the United States